Senator Esty may refer to:

Constantine C. Esty (1824–1912), Massachusetts State Senate
Donald Esty Jr. (fl. 1980s–2010s), Maine State Senate
Edward S. Esty (1824–1890), New York State Senate